Caerlaverock Castle is a moated triangular castle first built in the 13th century. Caerlaverock was a stronghold of the Maxwell family from the 13th century until the 17th century, when the castle was abandoned. It was besieged by the English during the Wars of Scottish Independence, and underwent several partial demolitions and reconstructions over the 14th and 15th centuries. In the 17th century, the Maxwells were created Earls of Nithsdale, and built a new lodging within the walls, described as among "the most ambitious early classical domestic architecture in Scotland". In 1640 the castle was besieged for the last time and was subsequently abandoned. Although demolished and rebuilt several times, the castle retains the distinctive triangular plan first laid out in the 13th century. Caerlaverock Castle was built to control trade in early times.

The castle, which is protected as a scheduled monument, is in the care of Historic Environment Scotland, and is a popular tourist attraction.

Etymology
The name Caerlaverock is of Brittonic origin. The first part of the name is the element  meaning "an enclosed, defensible site", (Welsh caer meaning "fort, city"). The second part of the name may be the personal name Lïμarch (Welsh Llywarch), or a lost stream-name formed from the adjective laβar, "talkative" (Welsh llafar, see Afon Llafar), suffixed with –ǭg, "having the quality of", or the adjectival suffix -īg. The present form has been influenced by the Scots word laverock, "skylark".

History

The present castle was preceded by several fortifications in the area: a Roman fort on Ward Law Hill and a British hill fort that was in use around 950. The chronicles in the 12th-century Annales Cambriæ state that King Gwenddoleu ap Ceidio died nearby at the Battle of Arthuret in 573. His death triggered his bard Myrddin Wyllt to go insane and retreat into the woods, an act that later inspired the character of Merlin in Arthurian legend.

The Maxwell family can be traced back to Undwin and his son Maccus in the 11th century; Maccus gave his name to the barony of Maccuswell or Maxwell. His grandson, John de Maccuswell (d. 1241), was first Lord Maxwell of Caerlaverock. The Baronies of Maxwell and Caerlaverock then passed down through the male line, sometimes collaterally. Robert de Maxwell of Maxwell, Caerlaverock and Mearns (d. 1409) rebuilt Caerlaverock castle and was succeeded by Herbert Maxwell of Caerlaverock (d. 1420).

The earliest mention of the lands of Caerlaverock is around 1160, when they were granted to the monks of Holm Cultram Abbey. Around 1220 Alexander II of Scotland granted the lands to Sir John Maxwell, making him Warden of the West March. Sir John Maxwell also served as Chamberlain of Scotland from 1231 to 1233, and began work on the first castle at Caerlaverock. This castle was square in shape and was one of the earliest stone castles to be built in Scotland. It had a moat with a bridge facing north. Only the foundations and remains of a wooden enclosure around it remain.

It was here that Sir John's brother Sir Aymer Maxwell began construction of the present castle. Sir Aymer also served as Chamberlain in 1258–1260, and was Justiciar of Galloway in 1264. In the 1270s the "new" castle was completed, and Herbert Maxwell, nephew of John Maxwell, occupied it.

When the moat around the second castle was dug, the quarrying was probably a source of building stone for the castle. While the gatehouse stands on natural rock, the rest of the castle was built on a clay platform created especially for the castle.

Wars of independence
In 1299, the garrison of Caerlaverock attacked Lochmaben Castle which was held by English forces.

Siege of Caerlaverock

In July 1300 King Edward I of England marched north with an army including eighty-seven of the Barons of England and several knights of Brittany and Lorraine, and besieged Caerlaverock. Those present on the English side included Henry de Lacy, Earl of Lincoln; Robert FitzWalter; Humphrey de Bohun, Earl of Hereford; John, Baron Segrave; Guy de Beauchamp, Earl of Warwick; John of Brittany, Earl of Richmond; Patrick, Earl of March and his son; Prince Edward (the future Edward II); Thomas, Earl of Lancaster, and his brother Henry; Richard Fitzalan, Earl of Arundel; and Antony Bek, Bishop of Durham. The Maxwells, under their chief Sir Eustace Maxwell, mounted a vigorous defence of the castle which repelled the English several times. In the end, the garrison was compelled to surrender, after which it was found that only sixty men had withstood the whole English army for a considerable period.

During the siege the English heralds composed a roll of arms in Old French verse, known as the Siege of Caerlaverock, in which each noble or knight present was named, his feats of valour described, and a poetic blazon of his armorial bearings given.

Recovery
Possession of the castle was subsequently restored to Sir Eustace Maxwell, Sir Herbert's son, who at first embraced the cause of John Balliol, and in 1312 received from Edward II an allowance of £20 for the more secure keeping of the castle. He afterwards gave in his adherence to Robert Bruce, and his castle, in consequence, underwent a second siege by the English, in which they were unsuccessful. Fearing that this important stronghold might ultimately fall into the hands of the enemy, and enable them to make good their hold on the district, Sir Eustace dismantled the fortress, service and sacrifice for which he was liberally rewarded by Robert Bruce.

By 1337 the castle was once again inhabited, and Sir Eustace now changed sides again, giving his support to Edward Balliol. Around 1355 Sir Roger Kirkpatrick of Closeburn captured Caerlaverock for David II of Scotland, and partly dismantled the castle.

Repair and rebuilding

By the end of the Wars of Independence in the mid-14th century, Caerlaverock had been regained by the Maxwells, with Sir Robert Maxwell rebuilding much of the castle between 1373 and 1410. Further work was undertaken by Robert, 2nd Lord Maxwell, in the mid-15th century, probably involving reconstruction of the gatehouse. A new west range was added within the walls around 1500.

The Catholic Maxwells took up the cause of Mary, Queen of Scots, after her forced abdication in 1567. Caerlaverock was besieged in 1570 by an English Protestant force led by the Earl of Sussex, and was again partly demolished, including the destruction of the gatehouse with gunpowder.

By 1593, John, 8th Lord Maxwell was repairing the castle again, building up the gatehouse for defence against the Johnstones of Annandale, with whom the Maxwells were feuding. The 8th Lord was killed by the Johnstones during a fight at Dryfe Sands, and in 1613 the 9th Lord Maxwell was executed for the revenge murder of Sir James Johnstone.

Earls of Nithsdale
In 1619 Robert, 10th Lord Maxwell, married Elizabeth Beaumont, cousin of the Duke of Buckingham, a favourite of James VI of Scotland. He was subsequently made Earl of Nithsdale and appointed to the Privy Council of Scotland. To reflect his new status he built the elaborate south and east ranges within the castle, known as the Nithsdale Lodging.

The new ranges were completed around 1634. Nithsdale was at Caerlaverock in August 1637, and wrote to Sir Richard Graham asking for dogs for hunting and breeding. Religious turmoil soon turned against the Catholic Maxwells. In 1640 the Protestant Covenanter army besieged Caerlaverock for 13 weeks, eventually forcing its surrender. According to Sir Henry Vane, the Earl and Countess of Nithsdale and their page were allowed to leave, but 40 defenders called Maxwell were put to the sword. The south wall and tower were demolished, and the castle was never repaired or reoccupied.

Nature reserve
Caerlaverock Castle is within the Nith Estuary National Scenic Area, protected for its scenic qualities, with the castle recognised as a landmark of the area. It is an internationally important wintering site for waterfowl and wading birds, including the barnacle goose.

Cultural references
The castle was used as a location for the 2011 romantic comedy film The Decoy Bride.

References

Bibliography

External links

Historic Environment Scotland: Visitor guide

Castles in Dumfriesshire
Scheduled Ancient Monuments in Dumfries and Galloway
Wars of Scottish Independence
Historic house museums in Dumfries and Galloway
Renaissance architecture in Scotland
Historic Scotland properties in Dumfries and Galloway
Clan Maxwell
Triangular buildings